Paddy Wharton (born 27 May 2000) is an English footballer who plays as a goalkeeper for Runcorn Linnets.  He played professionally for Tranmere Rovers. He has also played on loan at Colwyn Bay, Marine, Stalybridge Celtic and Atherton Collieries

Playing career
Wharton spent his childhood at the Academies at Liverpool and Everton, before he came through the academy at Tranmere Rovers to sign professional forms in January 2017. He joined Northern Premier League Division One West team Colwyn Bay on loan on 18 August 2018. He made his debut later that day, keeping a clean sheet in a 1–0 victory over Kendal Town at Llanelian Road. He played seven games for the "Seagulls" before returning to Prenton Park; Bay manager Craig Hogg said that "both players [Wharton and Jay Devine] have been excellent to work with and are a total credit to their club". On 9 October, Wharton made his senior debut for Tranmere in a 6–0 defeat at Shrewsbury Town in the group stages of the EFL Trophy.

On 22 October, he joined Northern Premier League Premier Division side Stalybridge Celtic on a one-month loan deal after "Celts" goalkeeper Jake Turner picked up an injury. He made seven appearances for Simon Haworth's "Bridge", before he returned to Rovers in November. He immediately joined Northern Premier League Premier Division side Marine on loan. He made ten appearances for Neil Young's "Mariners". On 7 January 2019, he returned to Stalybridge Celtic for his second loan spell of the season at Bower Fold, this time joining until the end of the 2018–19 season.

He was released by Tranmere at the end of the 2018–19 season.

In May 2019 he joined FC United of Manchester.

In December 2019 he joined Atherton Collieries on loan. During the loan he played in the FA Trophy, which lead to FC United stating they would never play him again after the loan expires as they had agreed a Gentlemen's agreement that he wouldn't play in the FA Trophy. Wharton denied this agreement existed and called the situation a disgrace.

Statistics

References

2000 births
Living people
English footballers
Association football goalkeepers
Liverpool F.C. players
Everton F.C. players
Tranmere Rovers F.C. players
Colwyn Bay F.C. players
Stalybridge Celtic F.C. players
Marine F.C. players
Northern Premier League players
F.C. United of Manchester players
Atherton Collieries A.F.C. players